Laxman Lal Karna is a Nepali politician and was Minister of Land Management, Cooperatives and Poverty Alleviation since 4 June 2021 but was removed from the post by Supreme Court on 22 June 2021 making the tenure of just 18 days and shortest till date. He was also a member of the House of Representatives of the federal parliament of Nepal. He was elected under the first-past-the-post system from Parsa-4 constituency, representing Rastriya Janata Party Nepal. He defeated his nearest rival Ramesh Rijal of Nepali Congress by acquiring 20,738 votes to Rijal's 14,702.

See also 

 People's Progressive Party

References

Living people
Place of birth missing (living people)
Rastriya Janata Party Nepal politicians
Madhesi people
Nepal MPs 2017–2022
1947 births

Members of the 1st Nepalese Constituent Assembly
Members of the 2nd Nepalese Constituent Assembly
Nepal Sadbhawana Party politicians
Sadbhavana Party politicians
People's Socialist Party, Nepal politicians
Loktantrik Samajwadi Party, Nepal politicians